Falintolol is a beta-adrenergic receptor antagonist.

References 

Beta blockers
Cyclopropanes
Ketoximes
Secondary alcohols
Amines
Tert-butyl compounds